In enzymology, a 4-hydroxythreonine-4-phosphate dehydrogenase is an enzyme that catalyzes the chemical reaction

4-phosphonooxy-L-threonine + NAD+  (2S)-2-amino-3-oxo-4-phosphonooxybutanoate + NADH + H+

Thus, the two substrates of this enzyme are 4-phosphonooxy-L-threonine and NAD+, whereas its 3 products are (2S)-2-amino-3-oxo-4-phosphonooxybutanoate, NADH, and H+.

This enzyme belongs to the family of oxidoreductases, specifically those acting on the CH-OH group of donor with NAD+ or NADP+ as acceptor. The systematic name of this enzyme class is 4-phosphonooxy-L-threonine:NAD+ oxidoreductase. Other names in common use include NAD+-dependent threonine 4-phosphate dehydrogenase, L-threonine 4-phosphate dehydrogenase, 4-(phosphohydroxy)-L-threonine dehydrogenase, PdxA, and 4-(phosphonooxy)-L-threonine:NAD+ oxidoreductase. This enzyme participates in vitamin B6 metabolism.

Structural studies

References

 
 
 

EC 1.1.1
NADH-dependent enzymes
Enzymes of known structure